No. 21 Squadron was a squadron of the Royal New Zealand Air Force. Formed in May 1944, it was equipped with F4U-1 Corsair fighter bombers.

History
21 Squadron was deployed to Kukum Field on Guadalcanal from June–July 1944, to Piva Airfield on Bougainville from July–September 1944 and then returned to Guadalcanal from November–December 1944. 21 Squadron deployed to Green Island from April–May 1945 and then to Jacquinot Bay from May–July 1945. The squadron was disbanded in September 1945.

Commanding officers
Squadron Leader L. R. Bush May (1944–February 1945); 
Squadron Leader W. J. MacLeod (March–September 1945).

Notes

References

21
Squadrons of the RNZAF in World War II
Military units and formations established in 1944
Military units and formations disestablished in 1945